The 1928 United States presidential election in Alabama took place on November 6, 1928, as part of the 1928 United States presidential election, which was held throughout all contemporary forty-eight states. Voters chose twelve representatives, or electors to the Electoral College, who voted for president and vice president. This was the last election in which Alabama had twelve electoral votes: the Great Migration caused the state to lose congressional districts after the 1930 Census produced the first Congressional redistricting since 1911.

Alabama voted narrowly for the Democratic nominee, Governor Alfred E. "Al" Smith of New York, over the Republican nominee, Secretary of Commerce Herbert Hoover of California. Smith's running mate was Senator Joseph Taylor Robinson of Arkansas, while Hoover's running mate was Senate Majority Leader Charles Curtis of Kansas. The only other candidate on the ballot was Socialist Norman Thomas, who received a mere 460 votes.

Background
Since the 1890s, Alabama had become a one-party state ruled by the Democratic Party. Disenfranchisement of almost all African-Americans and a large proportion of poor whites via poll taxes, literacy tests and informal harassment had essentially eliminated opposition parties outside of presidential campaigns in a few northern hill counties. The only competitive statewide elections became Democratic Party primaries, and ever since 1900 the Democratic Party won over two-thirds of the limited number of votes cast even in presidential elections.

Between 1900 and 1924, the southern bloc had been able to veto presidential nominations by extralimital branches of the Democratic Party. This changed before the 1928 election, as most Democrats decided to sit out the convention due to their belief the party had no chance of winning the November election. Consequently, Al Smith, a four-term Governor of New York, was able to win the nomination on the first ballot.

General election campaign
Four characteristics of Smith made him anything but an ideal candidate for Southern Democrats: he was a devout Catholic, opposed to Prohibition, linked with New York City's Tammany Hall political machine, and the son of Irish and Italian immigrants. Whilst it is generally thought that the South would have accepted a man possessing one of those characteristics, the combination proved a bitter dose for many of Alabama's loyal Democrats. It was also thought by some, including those close to the revived Ku Klux Klan, that Smith was too friendly with blacks and some Alabama whites unsubtly called Smith "nigger, nigger, nigger." Nonetheless, these people did not think Hoover any safer on the race issue, although they did prefer Hoover's view on Prohibition.

The conflict between disapproval of Smith's faith and policies on one hand and extreme traditional hostility towards the Republican Party in almost all of Alabama (the only exceptions being the historically anti-secession counties of Winston and a few populist strongholds like Chilton) produced an exceptionally bitter campaign. Black Belt whites – who had controlled the state government since disenfranchisement of blacks and poor whites – also felt Smith's social views obnoxious, especially his opposition to the Ku Klux Klan.

Consequently, many of Alabama's voters swore to vote for Hoover without declaring themselves Republicans, instead calling themselves "Hoovercrats" (a portmanteau of "Hoover" and "Democrat"). Defections were particularly pronounced in North Alabama, where a contiguous block of counties from Birmingham northeastwards to the Tennessee border uniformly gave majorities for Hoover. Hoover also won a number of counties in the far southern coastal regions, whose soils had always proved unsuitable for cotton plantations. On the other hand, the whites of the black belt, who were like Al Smith "wet" (opposed to prohibition of alcohol), did not bolt from the Democratic Party because of this alcohol issue and their strong view that the Democrats were the best safeguard for white supremacy.

Overall, Smith held the state by just over seven thousand votes, although opponents of Smith believed that electoral fraud was widespread in the Black Belt. State judges Hugh Locke, Horace Wilkinson and Ira Champion argued that up to seventeen thousand ballots for Hoover had been rejected. No recount, however, was ever contemplated by authorities. This result constitutes the second-closest presidential election in Alabama since Reconstruction tied with that of 1980, another Republican landslide this time affected by the personal vote in the South for Jimmy Carter, and 1848 which was the closest election decided by .112 percentage points in favor of Democratic nominee Lewis Cass. (1980 was decided by 1.30 percentage points and 1980 by 1.30 points)

A strong correlation was revealed between percentage of blacks in the population and (white) voter loyalty to the Democratic Party (with the r-value equaling 0.7268): of the twenty-six counties won by Hoover, only five had population over thirty percent Negro, and most of these were urban area less attached to the traditions of black belt politics, whilst Chambers County was the home of Hoovercrat senator J. Thomas Heflin. At the other extreme, of the ten counties possessing populations under ten percent African American in 1930, only Marion County stayed loyal to Smith and only by a very narrow margin.

Results

Results by county

See also
United States presidential elections in Alabama

Notes

References

Alabama
1928
1928 Alabama elections